River Heights is a provincial electoral division in the Canadian province of Manitoba. It was created by redistribution in 1957, and formally came into existence in the 1958 provincial election.  The riding is located in the south-central region of the City of Winnipeg.

River Heights is bordered on the east by Lord Roberts and Fort Rouge, to the south by Fort Whyte, to the north by Wolseley, and to the west by Tuxedo.

The riding's population in 1996 was 19,950. The riding's character is middle-class and upper-middle class. In 1999, the average family income was $77,701, and the unemployment rate was 5.90%. River Heights includes many of Winnipeg's oldest and most stately homes: the average value of dwelling house in the riding in 1999 was $117,937.

River Heights has a significant Jewish population, at 9% of the total. 38.5% of the riding's residents have university degrees, the highest percentage in the province. Voter turnout also tends to be extremely high in this riding, usually at over 80% of the eligible population.

The service sector accounts for 15% of the River Heights's industry, with educational services following at 14%.

From 1958 to 1986, River Heights was represented by members of the Progressive Conservative Party. Since that time, however, it has generally been represented by leaders of the provincial Liberal Party. Sharon Carstairs represented the riding from 1986 until her appointment to the Senate of Canada in 1994, and Jon Gerrard has represented the riding since 1999.

The Liberal Party has many prominent backers in this riding, including members of the Asper family (see Izzy Asper).

List of provincial representatives

Electoral results

Previous boundaries

References

Manitoba provincial electoral districts
Politics of Winnipeg